The Sri Lanka Sikhamani (Sri Lanka's precious gem ) is a national honour of Sri Lanka "for service to the nation". It is conventionally used as a title or prefix to the awardee's name. Sri Lanka Sikhamani ranks lower than Kala Keerthi.

Awardees
Awardees include: 

1987
 Malliya Wadu  Karunananda
 Halpawattage Hector Jeremius Peiris Jayawardene
 Hettiarachchige Don Sugathapala

1988
 Kudasingappulige Harry Christopher Gunawardena
 Nagoda Vithanage Franklin Nagaratne

1989
 Daisy Hemalatha Sugathadasa

1990
 Mohamad Yoosoof  Mohamad Thahir
 Jayasinghe Mudalige Juwanis Jayasinghe
 Thamotharam Somasekeram
 Samarapperuma Mudiyanselage Palitha Samarapperuma
 Udaya Gamini Sarath Kumara Nambukara Withana
 Eugene Cyril Melanius Waas

1991
 Anula Menike Udalagama
 Percy Tristam Jinendradasa
 Wilbert Kaggodaarachchi
 Noeyal John Joseph Peiris
 Asoka Chandrasoma Wijesurendra

1992
 Wijesinghe Arachchige Abayasinghe
 Ratnayake Mudiyanselage Gunathilake Banda Hangillipola
 Jinadasa Kulupana
 Felicia Wakwalle Sorensen

1993
 Mohammed Zemzem Akbar
 Senanayakaralalage Appuhamy Millangoda
 Nagalingam  Ratnasabapathy

1994
 Aboobacker Abdul Latiff Admani
 Don Dayananda Kasturiarachchi
 Muthu Banda Abayakoon Jayasekera
 Abdul Hameed Mohamed Maharoof
 Chandra Dissanayake
 Dennis Milton Hubert Ranaweera
 Kaluduru Somawathie de Silva Wickramasekera
 Abdul Samadh Ismail

2005
 Al-haj Mohamed Zainudeen Mohamed Badiudeen
 Ameena Faiz Musthapa
 B. E. S. J. Bastiampillai
 Kris Canekeratne
 Daya Rathnayake
 Daya Weththasinghe
 Edgar Gunetunga
 Ferrin Careem
 Gunadasa Kupuge
 Gunapala Nanayakkara
 H. Z. Jaffer
 Hiran Cooray
 Hiranthi Wijemanne
 Jayantha Balawardena
 J. K. D. S. H. Jayawardena
 J. M. S. Brito
 Jayasiri Mendis
 Kamala Peiris
 L. G. G. M. L. Mohammadu Naim
 M. Ramalingam
 Mahinda Palihawadana
 Mallika Hemachandra
 Manik Rodrigo
 Mendis Rohanadheera
 Mahamood Rizwan Shahabdeen
 Premila Senanayake
 R. I. T. Alles
 Rodney Vandergert
 Suppiah Achari Thiagarajah
 S. Arunachalam
 S. D. Gunadasa
 Sanath Ukwatte
 Tony Weerasinghe
 W. H. Piyadasa
 Y. Karunadasa
 Z. A. M. Refai

2017 
 Achi Mohamed Ishaq
 Chulamani Gedara Gunasoma Nawarathne
 Hetti Arachchige Piyadasa Abeywardane
 Krishnamoorthi Ratnam Ravindran
 Leelananda Prematilleke
 Sellappuliyage Lucian Benedict Rosa
 S. Pathmanathan

References

External links

 
Civil awards and decorations of Sri Lanka